Magic: The Gathering – Tactics was an online turn-based strategy game developed by Sony Online Entertainment, and based on the Magic: The Gathering trading card game series. First announced on November 2, 2009. The game was released January 18, 2011, for the PC, February 3, 2012, on Steam,. It is presumed that a previously announced PlayStation 3 version of the game was canceled due to the game being shut down on March 28, 2014.

Overview
Magic: The Gathering – Tactics is a turn-based strategy game, in which the player must defeat the opponent's Planeswalker. The player controls a Planeswalker and an army in the form of spellbooks.

Upon creation of an account, a player chooses one of the five colors in which to focus, as well as a figure to visually represent his or her Planeswalker.  New accounts initially receive starter decks for all of the colors, free of cost.  Cards from these starter decks cannot be traded.  Additional cards are obtainable via trades in an auction house, purchases in a cash shop, or rewards for completion of single-player scenarios.

Gameplay differs from the card game in several ways.  One difference is that there are no land cards to provide mana; instead, an incremental pool of mana is available to the player each turn, depending on the cards in his or her spellbook. Another notable difference is that the player's Planeswalker is able to level up and specialize in talents.  Also, battles progress on a grid-based map with figures representing creatures and Planeswalkers, each of which is controlled and moved by the players, much like a miniature game or tactical RPG.

Gameplay is separated into a number of campaigns and while players can access some for free additional content must be unlocked through the premium virtual currency used in all Sony Online Entertainment games, Station Cash.

Sony announced that a second set of figures will be added, increasing the number available to players. This set was scheduled to be added 'late this summer' along with some new game mechanics.

The second set was released in December 2011.

References

2011 video games
Products and services discontinued in 2014
Free-to-play video games
Magic: The Gathering software
PlayStation 3 games
Sony Interactive Entertainment games
Video games developed in the United States
Windows games
Inactive online games